Michalis Tsairelis (alternate spellings: Michail, Michailis, Mihalis) (Greek: Μιχάλης Τσαϊρέλης; born February 23, 1988) is a Greek professional basketball player for Promitheas Patras of the Greek Basket League and the EuroCup. He is a 2.08 m (6 ft 10 in) tall power forward-center.

Professional career
After playing with the Apollon Kalamarias in the Greek minors, during the 2006–07 season, Tsairelis began his professional career with Aris, in the Greek Basket League, during the 2007–08 season. He spent the 2008–09 season with AEL 1964, and the 2009–10 season with Trikala 2000. He then returned to Aris for the next two seasons, before joining PAOK in 2012.

He then moved to the Spanish League club Canarias in 2014. He joined the Greek EuroLeague club Olympiacos in February 2015.

On August 5, 2016, Tsairelis signed a two-year contract with Aris. After a very successful 2018-19 campaign with Promitheas Patras, Tsairelis signed a two-year contract with Ifaistos Limnou on July 3, 2019. 

On July 28, 2020, Tsairelis moved back to Thessaloniki for Iraklis. On March 11, 2021, he transferred to Peristeri, replacing Ioannis Bourousis. 

On August 3, 2021, Tsairelis signed with Larisa. In 35 league games, he averaged 7.4 points, 2.9 rebounds and 1 assist, playing around 21 minutes per contest. On July 29, 2022, Tsairelis returned to Promitheas Patras.

National team career
With Greece's junior national teams, Tsairelis played at the 2004 FIBA Europe Under-16 Championship, the 2006 FIBA Europe Under-18 Championship, the 2007 FIBA Europe Under-20 Championship, and the 2008 FIBA Europe Under-20 Championship.

He has also been a member of the senior men's Greek national basketball team. He played at the 2019 FIBA World Cup qualification.

Awards and accomplishments

Pro career
Greek Youth All-Star Game MVP: (2010)
2× Greek League Senior All-Star: (2013, 2014)
2× Greek League champion (2015, 2016)

References

External links
 Michalis Tsairelis at acb.com 
 Michalis Tsairelis at draftexpress.com
 Michalis Tsairelis at esake.gr 
 Michalis Tsairelis at eurobasket.com
 Michalis Tsairelis at euroleague.net
 Michalis Tsairelis at fiba.com
 Michalis Tsairelis at fibaeurope.com

1988 births
Living people
A.E.L. 1964 B.C. players
Aris B.C. players
CB Canarias players
Centers (basketball)
Greek Basket League players
Greek expatriate basketball people in Spain
Greek men's basketball players
Ifaistos Limnou B.C. players
Iraklis Thessaloniki B.C. players
Larisa B.C. players
Liga ACB players
Olympiacos B.C. players
P.A.O.K. BC players
Power forwards (basketball)
Peristeri B.C. players
Promitheas Patras B.C. players
Trikala B.C. players
Basketball players from Thessaloniki